Ceratophyllus chasteli is a species of flea in the family Ceratophyllidae. It was described by Beaucournu, Monnat and Launay in 1982.

References 

Ceratophyllidae
Insects described in 1982